Francesco Fausto Nitti (born 2 September 1899 in Pisa – died 28 May 1974, in Rome) was an Italian journalist and fighter against fascism. His father Vincenzo (1871–1957) was evangelical preacher of the Italian Methodist Church.  His mother was Paola Ciari (1870–1932).

Biography
When Francesco Fausto Nitti was seventeen, he fought in the First World War. In 1924, after the death of Giacomo Matteotti (a socialist deputy killed by will of Benito Mussolini), Nitti started an active anti-fascist propaganda, and as a result in December 1926 he was arrested and confined in Lipari. Along with two other political prisoners, Carlo Rosselli and Emilio Lussu, he managed to escape in July 1929 and to take refuge in France, where they founded Giustizia e Libertà, a resistance movement opposing  fascism.

Nitti went to Spain in March 1937 and served the Republican faction as a major during the Civil War. After the defeat of his side, he came back to France where was relegated in a concentration camp and later sent on the Nazi Ghost Train in order to be deported in Germany; Nitti (as well as one hundred of the seven hundred prisoners) fled when the train was near the German frontier, after removing some planks from the floor of his wagon.

He returned to France and joined the maquis, helping the French Resistance. After  rejoining his family at Tolosa, in 1946 he eventually returned to Italy. Taking a variety of roles in anti-fascist associations, he was director of the Anpi- based review  “Independent Native land” and became a commune councilman in Rome.

Nitti died in Rome on May 28, 1974.

Sources
Translation of Italian Wikipedia entry
Francesco Fausto Nitti, Escape: The personal narrative of a political prisoner who was rescued from Lipari, the fascist "Devil's Island". Putnam(1930) ASIN: B0006AKUZY
Francesco Fausto Nitti, Nitti F. F., Le nostre prigioni e la nostra evasione, Edizioni Scientifiche Italiane, Napoli, 1946.
Francesco Fausto Nitti, Neofascismo allo specchio, ANPPIA, Roma,1968.
 Francesco Fausto Nitti,  Chevaux 8 – Hommes 70, Éditions Chantal, Toulouse, 1944. The escape from the train deporting him to Germany.
 Francesco Fausto Nitti, Il maggiore è un rosso, Edizioni Avanti! Milano - Roma, 1953. The taking part in Spanish Civil War.
 Pietro Ramella, Francesco Fausto Nitti - L'uomo che beffò Hitler e Mussolini, Aracne editrice, Roma, 2007. Biography of F.F. Nitti.

1899 births
1974 deaths
People from Pisa
Italian male journalists
Italian exiles
Italian anti-fascists
Members of Giustizia e Libertà
Italian military personnel of World War I
20th-century Italian journalists
20th-century Italian male writers